A list of films produced in Italy in 1972 (see 1972 in film):

References

Footnotes

Sources

External links
Italian films of 1972 at the Internet Movie Database

1972
Films
Lists of 1972 films by country or language